Hinchley may refer to:

Places
 Hinchley Wood English suburban village

People
 Albert Hinchley English footballer
 Edith Mary Hinchley British painter
 Gary Hinchley English footballer
 John Hinchley chemical engineer
 Pippa Hinchley English actress
 Tamsin Hinchley Australian volleyball player